The Aganane Formation is a Pliensbachian (Early Jurassic) geologic formation in the Azilal Province, central Morocco, known mostly for its rich tracksites (up to 1350 tracks) including footprints of thyreophoran, sauropod and theropod dinosaurs. This formation has been dated to the Pliensbachian stage of the Lower Jurassic, thanks to the find of the ammonite Arieticeras cf. algovianum, indicator of Middle Domerian=Uppermost Pliensbachian) in the upper zone, and lower delimitation by the foraminifers Mayncina termieri and Orbitopsella praecursor (indicators of Carixian=Lower Pliensbachian age). The dinosaur tracksites are all located a few metres below the Pliensbachian-Toarcian limit, being coeval and connected with the lowermost layers of the continental Azilal Formation. The Aganane Formation was also coeval with the Jbel Taguendouft Formation and the Tamadout 1 Formation, all developed along a local "platform-furrow" in the Middle Atlas Mountains, that act as a barrier controlling the western border of the Jurassic Atlas Gulf. The nearshore sections, including both carbonate platforms and close to sea terrestrial facies where located on an isolated internal domain thanks to the control of the barrier, allowing the Aganane Formation to develop on a hot and humid climate, where a local algal marsh had intermittent progradations, intercalated with a layer of terrigenous continental origin. The ichnosites were developed in tidal flats and coastal deposits suitable to sea floodings.

Locations such as Ait Athmane recover the typical Sinemurian-Pliensbachian mediterranean lithiotid bivalve reefs, composed by aggrupation of aberrant bivalves. These "Reefs" had a strong zonation, starting with the bivalves Gervilleioperna and Mytiloperna, restricted to intertidal and shallow-subtidal facies. Lithioperna is limited to lagoonal subtidal facies and even in some low-oxygen environments. Finally Lithiotis and Cochlearites are found in subtidal facies, constructing buildups. Locally, these reefs were developed as shallow subtidal, cross-bedded floatstones, later evolving to layers with evidence of subaerial exposure, including lagoonal marls, and bioturbated red mudstones with root traces and calcrete. These layers are abundant on the aberrant bivalves Lithioperna and Cochlearites, as well common corals, gastropods, the bivalve Opisoma and oncoids, all living in a sheltered lagoon in the interior of the local carbonate platform, similar to the Rotzo Formation of the Trento Platform.



Dinosaur tracks

Theropoda

Sauropodomorpha

Ornithischia

See also 
 List of dinosaur-bearing rock formations
 List of stratigraphic units with theropod tracks
 List of stratigraphic units with sauropodomorph tracks
 List of stratigraphic units with ornithischian tracks

References 

Geologic formations of Morocco
Jurassic System of Africa
Early Jurassic Africa
Jurassic Morocco
Pliensbachian Stage
Limestone formations
Dolomite formations
Ichnofossiliferous formations
Paleontology in Morocco